Nakuru Town West is a constituency in Kenya. It is one of eleven constituencies in Nakuru County that elect a member to the Kenya National Assembly.

Elections in the 2010s

References 

Constituencies in Nakuru County